Thomas Grey may refer to:

 Sir Thomas Grey (constable) (died c. 1344), English soldier, Constable of Norham Castle
 Sir Thomas Grey (chronicler) (died c. 1369), English soldier and chronicler, son of the above
 Sir Thomas Grey (conspirator) (1384–1415), English aristocrat, ringleader of the Southampton Plot
 Thomas Grey, 1st Marquess of Dorset (1451–1501), English nobleman and courtier, also Earl of Huntingdon
 Thomas Grey, 2nd Marquess of Dorset (1477–1530), English magnate and courtier, son of the above
 Thomas Grey (Staffordshire MP) (by 1508–1559), MP for Staffordshire in 1554
 Thomas Grey (Norwich MP) (by 1519–58), MP for Norwich in 1557
 Sir Thomas Grey (Northumberland MP, died 1570) (before 1512–1570), MP for Northumberland in 1553, 1554 and 1558
 Sir Thomas Grey (Northumberland MP, died 1590) (1549–1590), MP for Northumberland in 1586
 Thomas Grey, 15th Baron Grey de Wilton (died 1614), English aristocrat and soldier
 Thomas Grey, Lord Grey of Groby (1623–1657), Member of Parliament for Leicester
 Thomas Grey, 2nd Earl of Stamford (circa 1654–1720), Chancellor of the Duchy of Lancaster, son of the above
 Thomas Grey (poet) (1863–1928), English poet
 Tommy Grey (died 1915), Welsh rugby union and rugby league player
 Thomas C. Grey, American legal academic and historian

See also
 Thomas de Grey (disambiguation)
 Thomas Gray (disambiguation)